The 1968 South American Basketball Championship for Women was the 12th instance of the tournament. The host city was Santiago in Chile. The winners were Brazil, who won their fifth title to date and third consecutive title.

Tournament 
The tournament was held in a single round robin format among the six competing teams. Brazil won all five of their games. The only change in teams from the previous iteration of the tournament was the loss of the Colombian team, who made their return to the tournament in 1970.

Results

Games

References

South
B
South American Basketball Championship for Women
November 1968 sports events in South America
1968 in Brazilian sport
1968 in Chilean sport
1968 in Argentine sport
1968 in Ecuadorian sport
1968 in Peruvian sport
1968 in Paraguayan sport